Sir Andrew Philip Witty (born 22 August 1964) is a British business executive, who is the current chief executive officer (CEO) of UnitedHealth Group. He was also the CEO of GlaxoSmithKline between 2008 and 2017. He formerly held the role of chancellor of the University of Nottingham.

Early life
Witty attended Malbank School (originally the "Nantwich and Acton Grammar School") in Nantwich, and then gained a bachelor's degree in economics from the University of Nottingham.

Career
Witty joined Glaxo UK in 1985 as a management trainee. He held various positions in the UK, including director of pharmacy & distribution in Glaxo Pharmaceuticals UK.

He served as a vice president and general manager of marketing of Glaxo Wellcome Inc., a subsidiary of GlaxoSmithKline with responsibility for strategy development, marketing execution and new product positioning. He served as an economic adviser to the governor of Guangzhou, China, from 2000 to 2002.

He was appointed president, Pharmaceuticals Europe of GlaxoSmithKline plc in January 2003 and succeeded Jean-Pierre Garnier as CEO following his retirement in May 2008.

In February 2009 he pledged to make a major change in the way GSK pharmaceuticals are priced, in an attempt to make vital drugs more affordable in countries with the lowest incomes. At the same time he announced that GSK would place certain patents in a pool so that they were freely available for others in the search for new drugs.

From 2010 until 2015, Witty served on the business advisory board of Prime Minister of the United Kingdom, David Cameron.

In October 2012 it was announced that he had been appointed the chancellor of the University of Nottingham with effect from 1 January 2013, having maintained strong ties with the university since graduation. Witty announced his retirement from the role of chancellor in November 2017.

In July 2013, the People's Republic of China announced that they were investigating allegations of fraud perpetrated by GSK going back to 2007 and involving thousands of millions of renminbi. Witty stated "It appears that certain senior executives in the China business have acted outside our processes and controls to both defraud the company and the Chinese health care system. To see these allegations about people working for GSK is shameful. For me personally they are deeply disappointing."

From 2013 to 2015, Witty served on the UNAIDS–Lancet Commission for Defeating AIDS and Advancing Global Health, co-chaired by Joyce Banda, Nkosazana Dlamini Zuma and Peter Piot. From 2015 until 2016, he was a member of the UN High-Level Panel on Access to Medicines, led by Ruth Dreifuss and Festus Mogae.

In November 2015, Witty's leadership of GSK was criticised by Neil Woodford, who said that "he’s not doing a very good job". Woodford called for GSK to be split into four companies. In March 2016, Witty announced that he was to step down as chief executive.

From 2017 until 2018, Witty led the National Health Service’s Accelerated Access Collaborative.  

In July 2018, Witty became CEO of Optum, a division of UnitedHealth Group. In November 2019, he was named president of UnitedHealth, in addition to his role as CEO of Optum.

In April 2020, Witty took a one-year leave of absence from Optum to assist the World Health Organization in developing a vaccine for COVID-19. In May 2020, he was appointed to the expert advisory group for the UK Government's Vaccine Task Force, chaired by Patrick Vallance. 

Witty became CEO of UnitedHealth Group in February 2021.

In April 2021, he was also appointed to the Pandemic Preparedness Partnership (PPP), an expert group chaired by Vallance to advise the G7 presidency held by the government of Prime Minister of the United Kingdom, Boris Johnson.

Corporate Membership

Corporate boards 
 G1 Therapeutics, non-executive director (since 2017)
 Synthego, member of the advisory board (since 2017)
 Hatteras Venture Partners, advisor

Non-profit organizations 
 Imperial College Business School, chair of the advisory board (since 2020)
 Duke Institute for Health Innovation (DIHI), member of the global advisory board
 Singapore Land Authority Board, member

Recognition
Witty was knighted in the 2012 New Year Honours for services to the economy and the UK pharmaceutical industry. He was also conferred the Honorary Citizen of Singapore in 2018.

References

External links
 Witty’s biography at GlaxoSmithKline

Living people
GSK plc people
English chief executives
Place of birth missing (living people)
Alumni of the University of Nottingham
Businesspeople in the pharmaceutical industry
Knights Bachelor
People from Nantwich
1964 births
Honorary Citizens of Singapore
American chief executives of Fortune 500 companies